Ibrahim Fiqi Yusuf, more commonly known as Kite Fiqi, was a Somali military leader and a poet. As a military leader, he led the Soocane faction during the early to mid 19th century, consisting of forces from various sub-divisions of the Habr Je'lo clan. The Soocane faction ruled over most of what is today eastern Somaliland.

Overview 
Kite Fiqi was born in 1810 to a religious family.  He belonged to the Habr Je'lo clan, part of the larger Isaaq clan family. His father, Fiqi Yusuf, was a scholar.

See Also
Hadrawi
Salaan Carrabey
Hussein Hasan
Farah Nur

References 

Ethnic Somali people
1810 births
1870 deaths
Isaaq Sultanate